The Myths and Legends of King Arthur and the Knights of the Round Table is a studio album by English keyboardist Rick Wakeman, released on 27 March 1975 by A&M Records. It is a concept album based on the stories and people of the King Arthur legend. Wakeman started to write the music in 1974 while recovering from a heart attack and recorded it with his five-piece band the English Rock Ensemble, the New World Orchestra, and the English Chamber Choir.

King Arthur received positive reviews, though some labelled it a symbol of progressive rock excess. It reached No. 2 on the UK Albums Chart and No. 21 on the US Billboard 200. It was certified gold in the US, Brazil, Japan, and Australia. The album was promoted with a world tour in 1975 that included three shows at Wembley Arena performed as an ice show, the last time it was performed in its entirety until 2016. The album was reissued in 2015 with a Quadrophonic mix, and re-recorded in 2016 with additional parts previously removed from the original score due to time constraints.

Background 
In July 1974, the 25-year-old Wakeman headlined the Crystal Palace Garden Party VII concert held at Crystal Palace Park in London, with his rock band, a symphony orchestra, and choir. He had left the progressive rock band Yes two months prior over differences surrounding their creative direction and continued with his solo career, which had reached newfound success after his second album Journey to the Centre of the Earth (1974) had become the first from A&M Records to chart at number one. Despite the success, Wakeman's health deteriorated during the preparations for the Crystal Palace show. The stress of putting it together resulted in Wakeman going without sleep in the five days prior to the event, and he cracked some bones in his wrist after he fell over in a pub. Before he went on stage Wakeman received three injections, including one of morphine. Coupled with his frequent smoking and heavy drinking, the situation culminated several days later with Wakeman having three minor heart attacks.

During his recovery at Wexham Park Hospital in Berkshire, Wakeman's management paid a visit where a specialist advised them that Wakeman cease all performing and retire, but Wakeman ignored the advice and began to write songs for his next studio album later that evening. He had stayed on a farm in Trevalga, Cornwall, near to the legendary site of Arthur's castle in Tintagel, for five months in his youth, an experience which had stuck with him ever since. This influenced his decision to make a concept album based on the legend of King Arthur and the people and stories based around him. The album was revealed in the music press as early as August 1974. "The Last Battle" was the first track that Wakeman worked on, its title being a reference to his near-fatal condition. Wakeman kept track of his musical ideas by humming them into the microphone of a cassette tape recorder that someone he knew brought into his hospital room in secret. Upon leaving hospital Wakeman retreated to his new home at Burnham Beeches in Buckinghamshire, and tested the parts he had written.

Before King Arthur was recorded, Wakeman underwent his 1974 North American tour, his first full-scale tour as a solo artist, in September and October which featured his band, an orchestra and choir. The production ultimately cost him around £125,000. Shortly before the tour, Wakeman had assembled a demo tape containing the main themes of King Arthur and played it to Melody Maker journalist Chris Welch, who described it as "a stately, inspired follow-up" to Journey.

Recording and music
Upon his return to England from his North American tour, Wakeman and his band retreated to Morgan Studios in Willesden, London to record King Arthur from 16 October 1974 to 10 January 1975. The line-up of Wakeman's band had changed by the time of recording, with Gary Pickford-Hopkins and Ashley Holt on lead vocals, Jeffrey Crampton on acoustic and electric guitars, Roger Newell on bass, Barney James on drums, and John Hodgson on percussion. They were joined by the New World Orchestra, an ensemble formed by musicians picked by David Katz that included members of the London Symphony Orchestra, conductor David Measham, the English Chamber Choir with choirmaster Guy Protheroe, and the Nottingham Festival Vocal Group. Before recording could begin, the band had to wait for their equipment to be transported from the US and repaired, after the roadies had damaged the flight cases carrying their instruments. Rehearsals then took place for around two and a half weeks. An early idea for the album had engineer Paul Tregurtha inform Wakeman that what he wanted was "technically impossible", partly due to the lack of available tracks on the recording machine to produce his desired final mix.

Wakeman encountered some difficulty with the songwriting as many of the stories described in the books gave different accounts. After reading eight books himself, he picked the details he found the most "colourful" which included taking a passage from a children's book on the subject. He settled on four widely known stories and two lesser known, and proceeded to adapt them to music and lyrics. Much of the album was based around the three swords based around the legend: the sword Arthur pulled out from the stone and anvil, the Excalibur which some believe was instead handed to Arthur by the Lady of the Lake, and the one associated to Galahad. Wakeman incorporated ideas from his personal life into the music, he said: "It's as much about me as Arthur."

"Guinevere" was a song that Wakeman had arranged six years prior to recording the album. Wakeman wrote violin arrangements for "Sir Lancelot and the Black Knight" that were so fast for the players, biographer Dan Wooding wrote they "collapsed with laughter" upon viewing the score. After some false starts, they played the music correctly after Wakeman instructed them they play twice as fast as he originally wanted. "I thought I'd teach the ones who were cocky a lesson". "Merlin the Magician" is in three parts; Wakeman had read several descriptions of the character and conjured the image of "a little old man preparing his potions", so he therefore introduces the song with a quiet theme. One book depicted Merlin working in the basement of a castle, "surrounded by bottles and liquids like a mad professor", which inspired the heavier second theme. The piano and banjo section arose from a story that involved Merlin falling in love and chasing after a young girl, who eventually shuts him in a cave where he dies.

Release

Commercial performance 
King Arthur was released on 27 March 1975. the album peaked at number 2 on the UK Albums Chart and number 21 on the Billboard 200 in the United States. King Arthur became Wakeman's third consecutive gold album to be certified by the Recording Industry Association of America, and was also certified gold in Brazil, Japan and Australia. The album has sold 12 million copies in total.

"Arthur" has been used by the BBC as the theme to its election night coverage from 1979 to 1997, and 2005, with the track returning with new instrumentation by the BBC News theme composer David Lowe for the corporation's 2019 United Kingdom general election coverage.

Wembley ice show 

Wakeman wanted a unique show for King Arthur in England, his first UK shows since Crystal Palace, rather than a standard concert performance. An early idea of his was to perform the album at Tintagel Castle as part of a King Arthur Day event with a medieval pageant and jousting knights. Wakeman was informed the castle was unsuitable for concerts, so he suggested to his promoter, Harvey Goldsmith, the idea of staging the show in a field beside it with a large inflatable castle. After travelling to Tintagel to investigate the possibility, Goldsmith found the land was crown property and a series of letters to the Duchy of Cornwall about the show failed to generate a response. A show at Tintagel was abandoned, and Wakeman suggested Wembley Stadium but Goldsmith explained it was not feasible. The keyboardist suggested Wembley Arena, but booking the venue caused a problem as the Ice Follies were scheduled to perform afterwards and the arena had already become an ice rink. Goldsmith and Wakeman's management instead suggested a scaled down show at the Royal Albert Hall, but Wakeman insisted on Wembley, and subsequently told a Melody Maker reporter that he would be presenting King Arthur as an ice show, "so there was no going back".

King Arthur was performed for three sell out nights from 30–31 May and 1 June that were attended by 27,000 people in total. Wakeman funded the production with his own money which included his band the English Rock Ensemble, an orchestra and choir playing in the round, a narrator, and 19 international ice skaters who reenacted the scenes in costume. A sound system by Clair Brothers had to be shipped in from the US as there was not a system in England suitable for the event. Though the shows sold out and raised publicity for the album, they ultimately lost money. The original plan was to hold three evening shows with a matinee on 31 May which would have helped bring the production to a small profit, but it was cancelled. One show was filmed and broadcast on television. 

Production problems became manifest early on. When it was announced that horses would be part of the show, animal welfare groups demanded it be canceled. Wakeman responded with a press conference at the venue where skaters dressed as knights came out riding two-dimensional wooden horses. "You weren't thinking there would be real horses, were you?” he said, to much media mirth.

The first performance was imperfect. When the actor playing the young Arthur pulled the sword from the stone, the anvil used to anchor the sword came out as well, since it had not itself been anchored. The actress playing Guinevere inadvertently skated over her veil, tearing her headgear out. The chainmail under Wakeman's cape accidentally caught on something as he was descending from his seat at one point, leaving him dangling over the ice. The dry ice fog, when used over real ice, created a mist that rose ever higher and thicker, to the point that the musicians not only could not see each other but had difficulty seeing their own instruments clearly enough.

At the end, during "The Last Battle", plans called for six skaters dressed as knights to take to the ice and fight to their mutual "deaths". Well before the song was over, one knight appeared to have survived, to skate aimlessly around the ice. Wakeman saw him and realized that one of the skaters had called in sick that day and the production had failed to find a replacement. The skater solved the problem by pretending to throw himself on his sword and disappearing under the fog.

The production was ranked No. 79 on the list of 100 Greatest Shocking Moments in Rock and Roll compiled by VH1. In 2014, Wakeman expressed a wish to stage King Arthur on ice once again at The O2 Arena.

Tour 
Wakeman supported the album with a concert tour of the United States, Canada, and Brazil between October and December 1975. The latter leg saw Wakeman perform with the Brazilian Symphony Orchestra in shows organised by the Brazilian government and attended by what Wooding estimated as around 500,000 in total. During his stop in Rio de Janeiro, Wakeman met Ronnie Biggs, one of the participants of the 1963 Great Train Robbery, who received tickets to the show and gave Wakeman the shirt he wore during the robbery. The tour marked a new line-up of Wakeman's band the English Rock Ensemble, featuring vocalist Ashley Holt, bassist Roger Newell, and newcomers guitarist John Dunsterville, drummer Tony Fernandez, trombonist Reg Brooks, and trumpeter Martin Shields.

Rerecording 
In 2012, Wakeman released a rerecorded version of Journey to the Centre of the Earth with additional pieces that were originally removed from the arrangement due to the limited time available on a vinyl record. He was booked to perform the extended album in Argentina that year, but the promoter also wished for a show with an extended version of King Arthur. Wakeman proceeded to work on new songs for the special occasion that were based on Morgan le Fay, Elaine, Camelot, Percival, and the Holy Grail. However, the promoter later asked for The Six Wives of Henry VIII instead and the new material remained unfinished. The idea resurfaced in 2015 when Stuart Galbraith, promoter of Wakeman's 2014 Journey tour, suggested a similar re-recording for King Arthur and to have it performed at The O2 Arena as part of the 2016 Stone Free Festival. Wakeman accepted, and the concert became a catalyst for a new, 88-minute version to be arranged and recorded in time for it.

The project was Wakeman's first to be completed through online direct-to-fan support, as suggested by Steve Hammonds of Universal Records. Wakeman had approached the label about the original album put out with the new songs added in, yet Hammonds wanted everything to be re-recorded and noted the label was too short on time to have it put down and placed it in their release schedule. Knowing the project would become expensive, Hammonds advised Wakeman to set up a fund on PledgeMusic to allow fans to donate towards its cost. The 90-day fund launched on 9 February 2016 with donation incentives to receive exclusive merchandise, deluxe album packages, attend recording sessions, and receive an executive producer credit. Wakeman was pleased with the pledge system and felt encouraged to deliver a good product from reading fan comments and messages. The fund ended with 140% of its target met and 2,891 individual pledgers.

The re-recording was produced at Angel Recording Studios in northern London with the English Chamber Choir, Wakeman's English Rock Ensemble, conductor Guy Protheroe, and Ann Manly assisting Protheroe with the orchestral scores. Narration was provided by actor Ian Lavender. Wakeman was often asked whether "Merlin the Magician" was to be kept an instrumental track; he decided to incorporate a version with lyrics. Sections of the horn arrangements were recorded many times to acquire the best sound and cut. The piano parts were recorded in several days at The Old Granary in Norfolk which has a Steinway grand piano, Wakeman's favourite model of the instrument. Roger Dean was commissioned to design its new artwork. It was released on 19 June 2016 by PledgeMusic/Gonzo Entertainment, the day of the O2 Arena concert.

Track listing 
All tracks and lyrics by Rick Wakeman.

2016 recording

Personnel 
Credits are adapted from the album's liner notes.

Musicians
 Rick Wakeman – synthesisers, keyboards, grand piano
 Gary Pickford-Hopkins – lead vocals
 Ashley Holt – lead vocals
 Jeffrey Crampton – lead and acoustic guitars
 Roger Newell – bass guitar
 Barney James – drums
 John Hodgson – percussion
 New World Orchestra
 English Chamber Choir

Production
 Rick Wakeman – production
 Terry Taplin – narrator
 Guy Protheroe – choirmaster
 Paul Tregurtha – engineer
 Jeremy Stenham – assistant engineer
 David Katz – orchestral co-ordination
 Wil Malone – orchestral arrangements
 David Measham – orchestra and choir conductor
 Fabio Nicoli – art direction
 Paul May – art direction, design
 Bob Elsdale – photography
 Bob Fowke – illustrations
 Dave Bowyer – illustrations
 Mansell Collection – engravings

2016 re-recording 
Credits are adapted from the liner notes.

The English Rock Ensemble
 Rick Wakeman – piano, keyboards, choir arrangement (new pieces)
 Ashley Holt – vocals
 Hayley Sanderson – vocals
 Tony Fernandez – drums, percussion
 Matt Pegg – bass guitar
 Dave Colquhoun – guitars, banjo

Personnel
 Ian Lavender – narration
 Orion Orchestra
 English Chamber Choir
 Nottingham Festival Male Voice Choir
 John Parry – bass
 Bob Hunter – bass
 Freddie Williams – tenor
 Eric Gethin – high tenor
 Val Williams – baritone
 Allan Grant – baritone
 Carey Wilson – tenor
 Michael Pearn – tenor
 Guy Protheroe – orchestral adaptation (1975 pieces), orchestral arrangement (new pieces)
 Ann Manly – orchestral adaptation (1975 pieces), orchestral arrangement (new pieces)
 Wil Malone – choir arrangement (1975 pieces)
 Roger Dean – painting, sketches, cover lettering

Charts

Year-end charts

Certifications

References

Bibliography

1975 albums
Arthurian music
Concept albums
Rick Wakeman albums
A&M Records albums
Albums produced by Rick Wakeman
Albums recorded at Morgan Sound Studios